The 2022 Great Lakes Valley Conference football season was the season of college football contested by the seven football-playing member schools of the Great Lakes Valley Conference (GLVC) as part of the 2022 NCAA Division II football season.

Indianapolis compiled a 9–1 record, won the GLVC championship, and was ranked No. 13 in the final regular season NCAA Division II poll. The Greyhounds lost to Pittsburg State in the first round of the NCAA Division II playoffs. Truman State compiled a 8-2 record and was ranked No. 23 in the final regular season poll. The Bulldogs defeated Tiffin in the third America's Crossroads Bowl. Indianapolis led the conference in scoring offense with an average of 35.8 points per game. Truman State led in scoring defense, giving up an average of 18.6 points per game.

Senior quarterback Turner Pullen of McKendree tallied 3,541 passing yards and was selected as the GLVC Offensive Player of the Year. Senior linebacker Ben Straatmann of Missouri S&T was selected as the Defensive Player of the Year. Toriano Clinton of Indianapolis led the conference with 1,001 rushing yards, and Yogi Flagler Jr. of McKendree led with 1,144 receiving yards.

Conference overview

Conference awards

Individual honors
 Offensive Player of the Year - Turner Pullen, senior, quarterback, McKendree
 Defensive Player of the Year - Ben Straatmann, senior, linebacker, Missouri S&T
 Special Teams Player of the Year - Gideon Niboh, junior, kick and punt returner, Missouri S&T
 Freshman of the Year - Cameren Smith, running back, Missouri S&T
 Co-Coaches of the Year - Chris Keevers, Indianapolis; Greg Nesbitt, Truman State

All-GLVC team
Offense
 Offensive linemen - Justin Watson, Truman State; Alan (BJ) Wilson, Quincy; Kednal Alexis, Indianapolis; Dane Eggert, Truman State; Dami Oyesanya, Southwest Baptist; Austin Keele, Indianapolis
 Quarterback - Turner Pullen, McKendree
 Running backs - Toriano Clinton, Indianapolis; Shamar Griffith, Truman State; Narkel LeFlore, McKendree
 Receivers - Yogi Flager, McKendree; Jacob Bachman, McKendree; Alonzo Derrick, Indianapolis; Curtis Cuillard, Southwest Baptist
 Tight end - Matt Hall, Truman State
 O-UT - Collin Sutton, Truman State

Defense
 Defensive linemen - Robert Greco, Truman State; Aaron Barnett, Indianapolis; Henry Preckel, Missouri S&T; Ben Miller, Truman State; Dylan Shelton, Indianapolis
 Linebackers - Ben Hunnius, Indianapolis; Ben Straatmann, Missouri S&T; Kiave Guerrier, Indianapolis; Isaiah Estes, Truman State; Coleton Smith, Southwest Baptist
 Landry Mavungu, Indianapolis; Ben Thomas, Truman State; Ben Watson, Truman State; Brenden Smith, Southwest Baptist; Michael Brown, Indianapolis
 D-UT - Jake Closser, Truman State

Special teams
 Kicker - Grant Ross, Truman State
 Punter - Parker Boyce, Missouri S&T
 Punt and kick returner - Gideon Niboh, Missouri S&T
 Long snappers - Doug Haugh, Indianapolis; Casey Voichahoske, Truman State

Teams

Indianapolis

The 2022 Indianapolis Greyhounds football team represented the University of Indianapolis as a member of the Great Lakes Valley Conference (GLVC) during the 2022 NCAA Division II football season. The Greyhounds compiled a 9–2 record (6–0 against conference opponents) and won the GLVC championship. They were ranked No. 13 nationally at the end of the regular season and No. 17 nationally at the end of the postseason.

Truman State

The 2022 Truman State Bulldogs football team represented Truman State University as a member of the Great Lakes Valley Conference (GLVC) during the 2022 NCAA Division II football season. The Bulldogs compiled a 9–2 record (5–1 against conference opponents) and finished second in the GLVC. They were ranked No. 23 nationally at the end of the regular season and No. 25 nationally at the end of the postseason.

Southwest Baptist

The 2022 Southwest Baptist Bearcats football team represented Southwest Baptist University as a member of the Great Lakes Valley Conference (GLVC) during the 2022 NCAA Division II football season. The Greyhounds compiled a 6–5 record (4–2 against conference opponents) and finished third in the GLVC.

McKendree

The 2022 McKendree Bearcats football team represented McKendree University as a member of the Great Lakes Valley Conference (GLVC) during the 2022 NCAA Division II football season. The Greyhounds compiled a 5–6 record (2–4 against conference opponents) and finished fourth in the GLVC.

Missouri S&T

The 2022 Missouri S&T Miners football team represented the Missouri University of Science and Technology as a member of the Great Lakes Valley Conference (GLVC) during the 2022 NCAA Division II football season. The Miners compiled a 3–7 record (2–4 against conference opponents) and finished fifth in the GLVC.

Quincy

The 2022 Quincy Hawks football team represented Quincy University as a member of the Great Lakes Valley Conference (GLVC) during the 2022 NCAA Division II football season. The Miners compiled a 4–7 record 1–5 against conference opponents) and finished sixth in the GLVC.

William Jewell

The 2022 William Jewell Cardinals football team represented William Jewell College as a member of the Great Lakes Valley Conference (GLVC) during the 2022 NCAA Division II football season. The Cardinals compiled a 2–9 record (1–5 against conference opponents) and finished fifth in the GLVC.

References

 
Great Lakes Intercollegiate Athletic Conference football